Tui St. George Tucker (born Lorraine St. George Tucker; November 25, 1924 – April 21, 2004) was an American modernist composer, conductor, recorder virtuoso and creator of unique musical instruments. Her compositions often feature microtonality and are strongly influenced by jazz, Buddhism, the music of Medieval Europe, and more. She would develop special recorders with extra holes, in addition to unique fingerings for modern recorders to allow for the playing of quarter tones, typically in 24-tone equal temperament.

Her avant-garde disposition and unique compositional language made her a staple in the 1940s New York scene, being encouraged by musicians such as John Cage and Larry Polansky. After relocating to North Carolina in 1947, however, she fell into obscurity – but continued to write a large number of works for various ensembles. The exact size of her oeuvre is debated, but is believed to comprise around a hundred works, a few being unfinished.

Early life

Childhood
Tucker was born in Fullerton, California, the daughter of an English father and a mother from New Zealand. Her family often referred to her as "Tui"; named for the eponymous bird native to New Zealand, where her mother was born. She attended Eagle Rock High School in northeast Los Angeles, California, graduating in 1941. She then attended Occidental College in Los Angeles from 1941 to 1944.

Career
Tucker relocated to central New York City in 1946, working as a composer, conductor, and recorder player, and spending most of her professional life in Greenwich Village. She had become a member of a circle of avant-garde composers living in the city, including John Cage, Lou Harrison, Virgil Thomson, and others. Her Indian Summer: Three Microtonal Antiphons on Psalm Texts written during this era, for two baritones and chamber ensemble, was among the first of her pieces to explore the use of quarter tones. Tucker met the German-American poet and scholar Vera Lachmann (1904-1985) in 1946, who she would maintain a lifelong relationship with.

From 1947 onward, she spent her summers at Camp Catawba, located near the Blue Ridge Parkway on the Boone side of Blowing Rock, North Carolina. Lachmann founded the camp two years prior, and Tucker would serve as the camp's music director at Lachmann's behest. Under her guidance, the young campers would perform music ranging from medieval plainsong and organum to works by contemporary American composers. Pianist Grete Sultan also worked there during several summers.

Many of her best known compositions date from this era include the Peyote Sonata (1956), which experiments with polyrhythms and experimental subdivisions, including a phrase in 15:16; a chamber piece dedicated to Polish composer Krzysztof Penderecki, and the cantata Drum Taps (1973) in eight movements, set to a libretto by Walt Whitman.

Personal life
In 1985, Tui inherited the camp grounds of Catawba from Lachmann after she died the same year. In accordance with Lachmann's will, Tucker sold the grounds to the Blue Ridge Parkway Foundation, while retaining a life estate and maintaining a residence on the grounds from 1985 until her death in 2004, continuing to conduct and compose for local instrumental ensembles.

Legacy
Her works have been performed by people and ensembles including the Kohon Quartet, pianists Grete Sultan and Loretta Goldberg, and recorder player Pete Rose. Her Little Pieces for Quartertone Piano is a standard work in the instrument's repertoire.

Music

List of selected works
Sorted chronologically:

Trio for Brass (1940) for two B flat trumpets and F horn
Duo Sonata (1946) for two soprano recorders
Partita (1946) for viola solo
First Piano Sonata (1947; rev. 1979) for piano solo
The Voice of the Lord (1949) for boy soprano and medieval lute
Peyote Sonata (1956) for piano solo
Sonata for Solo Recorder (The Bullfinch) (1960) for soprano recorder
Passacaglia for White Sunday (1964) for piano solo
Second Sonata for Solo Recorder (The Hypertonic) (1967) for soprano recorder
Drum Taps (1973), cantata for men's voices and chamber orchestra
Quartertone Carol (1980) for female voice and recorder trio
Quartertone Lullaby (1981) for recorder trio
Second Quartertone Lullaby (1982) for recorder trio
Catawba (1984) for baritone and piano
Adoramus Te (1985) for mixed chorus and piano
Ave Verum Corpus (1988) for SATB choir
All Colors of Light (1990) for chorus and piano
Amoroso 2 (1990) for tenor recorder (or flute)
The Lydian Sonata (1995) for violin and piano
Laudate (1996) for SATB choir
But Parting is Return (1999) for SATB choir

Discography
Indian Summer: Three Microtonal Antiphons on Psalm Texts. LP.  Greenville, Maine: Opus One, [1984?].
String Quartet No. 1. LP.  Greenville, Maine: Opus One, [1986?].
Herzliebster Jesu. CD. Harriman, New York: Spectrum, 1988. (Title of disc: Buxtehude, Moondog & Co., performed by Paul Jordan, Schuke organ.)
Piano Sonata No, 2, "The Peyote". CD. Greenville, Maine: Opus One, [1991?]. (Title of disc: Soundbridge, performed by pianist Loretta Goldberg.)
The Music of Tui St. George Tucker (1998). Baton Rouge, Louisiana: Centaur.

References

Notes

Citations

Sources

Further reading
 Bredow, Moritz von. 2012. Rebellische Pianistin. Das Leben der Grete Sultan zwischen Berlin und New York. Mainz: Schott Music.  (This book contains many aspects of the lives and the art of Tui St George Tucker, Vera Lachmann and Grete Sultan).

External links
The official Tui St. George Tucker website (launched in 2005) - includes her scores for download, contact information for the use of her scores, biography, photo gallery, and other memorabilia

"High Country Loses Artist, Composer Tui St. George Tucker 1924–2004" by Jay Brown, The Mountain Times (Boone, North Carolina), April 29, 2004
"Tui St. George Tucker’s Requiem To Premiere April 30: Blue Ridge Composer Honored with Concert at ASU", Jeff Eason, from The Mountain Times (Boone, North Carolina), April 14, 2005

1924 births
2004 deaths
20th-century American composers
20th-century American inventors
20th-century American women musicians
20th-century classical composers
20th-century American LGBT people
20th-century women composers
21st-century American composers
21st-century American women musicians
21st-century classical composers
21st-century American LGBT people
American classical composers
American classical musicians
American contemporary classical composers
American experimental musicians
American lesbian writers
American multi-instrumentalists
American music theorists
American musical instrument makers
American people of English descent
American recorder players
American women classical composers
Choral composers
Classical musicians from California
Composers for cello
Composers for pipe organ
Composers for piano
Composers for violin
Contemporary classical music performers
Electroacoustic music composers
Experimental composers
Inventors of musical instruments
Lesbian feminists
American LGBT songwriters
LGBT classical composers
LGBT classical musicians
American lesbian musicians
LGBT people from California
LGBT people from North Carolina
Lesbian songwriters
Microtonal composers
Microtonal musicians
Modernist composers
Music theorists
Musicians from Fullerton, California
Musicians from Los Angeles
Occidental College alumni
Outsider musicians
Lesbian composers
Watauga County, North Carolina
20th-century American musicologists
20th-century flautists
21st-century flautists